Wallingford is a town in New Haven County, Connecticut, United States, centrally located between New Haven and Hartford, and Boston and New York City. The population was 44,396 at the 2020 census. The community was named after Wallingford, in England.

History 

The Connecticut General Assembly created the town on October 10, 1667. This original plot of land near the Quinnipiac River is now considered Main Street. Starting on May 12, 1670, there were 126 people who lived in temporary housing, and five years later in 1675 there were 40 permanent homes.

In 1697 Wallingford was the site of the last witchcraft trial in New England. Winifred Benham was thrice tried for witchcraft and acquitted all three times.

The 1878 Wallingford tornado struck on August 9 of that year. It killed at least 29 and possibly as many as 34 people in Wallingford, the most by any tornado event in Connecticut history.

Wallingford is home to a large variety of industries and major corporations spanning the spectrum of the medical, health care, service, hi-tech specialty metal manufacturing and research development. The development of the Barnes Industrial Parks, Casimir Pulaski Industrial Park, Centract Park and MedWay Industrial Park have greatly contributed to a diversified tax base. An Interchange Zone which permits restrictive commercial development of office parks, research and development centers and hotels was created at the intersection of interstate 91 and Route 68. The Bristol-Myers Squibb Company, the town's largest taxpayer, has established a research and development facility in Wallingford's MedWay Industrial Park. The Bristol-Myers Squibb Company moved out in 2017 and the structures were demolished in 2018.

In terms of Wallingford's manufacturing and design history, silver-producing companies like Hall, Elton & Co., Simpson, Hall, Miller & Co. and R. Wallace & Sons are of particular note. Simpson, Hall, Miller & Co. as well as Wallingford's Watrous Manufacturing Co. later became part of the International Silver Company, which was headquartered in the neighboring city of Meriden.

Education 
The Wallingford Public School System consists of eight elementary schools: Cook Hill, E. C. Stevens, Highland, and Moses Y. Beach Elementary Schools covering Pre-K to second grade and Parker Farms, Pond Hill, Rock Hill, and Mary G. Fritz Elementary Schools covering grades three to five; two middle schools, Dag Hammarskjöld and James H. Moran; and two high schools, Lyman Hall and Mark T. Sheehan.

Private schools 

 Choate Rosemary Hall, a private, co-educational, college-preparatory boarding school
 Heritage Baptist Academy
 Holy Trinity School

Geography
According to the United States Census Bureau, the town has a total area of 39.9 square miles (103.3 km), of which 39.0 square miles (101.1 km) is land and 0.9 square miles (2.2 km), or 2.16%, is water.

The town of Wallingford sits astride the Quinnipiac River in northern New Haven County. Towns bordering Wallingford are Cheshire, Durham, Hamden, Meriden, Middlefield, North Branford and North Haven. Situated in the Hartford-New Haven-Springfield corridor, Wallingford is traversed by U.S. Route 5, Interstate 91, and State Highways Route 15 (Wilbur Cross Parkway), Route 68, Route 71 and Route 150.

Principal communities
 East Wallingford
 Quinnipiac (partly in North Haven)
 Tracy
 Wallingford Center
 Yalesville

Demographics

As of the census of 2020, there were 44,396 people and 18,518 households residing in the town.  According to the 2018 American Community Survey, the population density was 1,146.8 people per square mile.  There were 19,914 housing units.  The racial makeup of the town was 86% White, 2% African American, less than 1% Native American, 4% Asian, less than 1% from other races, and 1% from two or more races. Hispanic or Latino of any race were 7% of the population.

There were 18,518 households, out of which 64% were married couples living together, 12% had a female householder with no husband present, and 18% were non-families. The average household size was 2.4.

The 2021 median household income was $88,573, a 7% increase from the prior year. Wallingford's average household income was $105,374 and the mean family income was $127,343. The per capita income in the town was $44,813. More than 40% of all households earn more than $100,000 per year, with 9.2% earning more than $200,000. 

In the town, the population's ages were spread out, with 24.0% under the age of 18, 6.0% from 18 to 24, 30.7% from 25 to 44, 24.0% from 45 to 64, and 15.2% who were 65 years of age or older.  The median age was 39 years. For every 100 females, there were 93.0 males.  For every 100 females age 18 and over, there were 89.7 males.

Economy

Top employers
Top employers in Wallingford according to the town's 2020 Comprehensive Annual Financial Report:

Transportation 
Wallingford is also located on the New Haven–Springfield Line with daily passenger service to points north and south and to New York City via a connection in New Haven. It is served at Wallingford station by the CT Rail (Connecticut Department of Transportation) Hartford Line trains and by Amtrak's Hartford Line, Northeast Regional, and Valley Flyer.

Tweed New Haven Airport (HVN) in East Haven and Bradley International Airport (BDL) in Windsor Locks are the closest commercial airports to Wallingford.

Sports
In 1943 and 1944 the Boston Braves held spring training in Wallingford at Choate's Winter Exercise Building.
The town is the home of the Connecticut Bearcats, a New England Football League team.

Notable people

 Alice Blaski, outfielder in the All-American Girls Professional Baseball League
 Stephen R. Bradley, United States Senator
 Michael Buckley, YouTuber
 Bates Cooke, US Congressman
 D.J. Cotrona, actor
 Pasquale DeBaise (1926–2022), businessman and Connecticut state legislator
 Beverly Donofrio, author
 Morton Downey, singer, businessman 
 Morton Downey, Jr. (1932–2001), talk show host 
 Lauren Geremia, interior designer
 Robert Gober, influential contemporary artist
 Dorothy Kosinski, art scholar
 Raoul Lufbery, World War I flying ace
 John A. McGuire, member of the United States House of Representatives
 Art Nugent, cartoonist, creator of Uncle Art's Funland
 Jay Allen Sanford, author and cartoonist
 Samuel Simpson, silversmith and entrepreneur
 Hilton Valentine (1943–2021), musician associated with The Animals, moved to Wallingford in 1977

Points of interest 

 Choate Rosemary Hall
 Oakdale Theatre
 Paul Mellon Arts Center
 Yalesville Underpass

National Register of Historic Places
Ten buildings and districts in Wallingford are listed on the National Register of Historic Places:

 Center Street Cemetery, added August 1, 1997
 Franklin Johnson House, added November 23, 1998
 John Barker House, added August 3, 1974
 Joseph Blakeslee House, added April 13, 1998
 Nehemiah Royce House, added August 24, 1998
 Samuel Parsons House, added April 12, 1982
 Samuel Simpson House, added June 18, 1986
 Theophilus Jones House, added January 30, 1992
 Wallingford Center Historic District, added December 2, 1993
 Wallingford railroad station, added November 19, 1993

Citations

General references
 Davis, Charles Henry Stanley (1870). History of Wallingford, Conn., from Its Settlement in 1670 to the Present Time, Including Meriden, which was One of Its Parishes until 1806, and Cheshire, which was Incorporated in 1780. Meriden, CT: Charles Henry Stanley Davis.
 Gillespie, Charles Bancroft (1895). Souvenir History of Wallingford, Connecticut, 1895. New Haven, CT: Journal Publishing Co.
 Kendrick, John B. (1878). History of the Wallingford Disaster. Hartford, CT: Case, Lockwood and Brainard Co.

External links

 Town of Wallingford official website
 Maps of Wallingford (1881–1919) online
 History books on Wallingford (1870–1918) online

 
1667 establishments in Connecticut
Populated places established in 1667
Towns in Connecticut
Towns in New Haven County, Connecticut
Towns in the New York metropolitan area